Marcus Henry (born February 21, 1986) is a former Canadian football wide receiver. After playing college football for Kansas, he was drafted by the New York Jets in the sixth round of the 2008 NFL Draft. He also played for the Edmonton Eskimos, Ottawa Redblacks, and Montreal Alouettes of the Canadian Football League (CFL).

Professional career

New York Jets
The New York Jets drafted Henry in the sixth round (171st overall) of the 2008 NFL Draft. Henry was considered a "developing" prospect; however, his height advantage attracted the Jets' attention. The Jets signed Henry to a rookie contract on June 6, 2008. Henry made the active roster however he was inactive for the first two games of the season until he was waived by the team on September 22, 2008. Henry was subsequently signed to the team's practice squad on September 24, 2008 where he remained for the remainder of the season.

Following the season, Henry was signed to a reserve/future contract on January 24, 2009. During training camp practices, backup quarterback Erik Ainge praised Henry, who taught his fellow receivers how to use their strengths to their advantage. In spite of the positive praise, Henry was again released from the team on September 5, 2009 during the final roster cuts. Henry was signed to the team's practice squad, two days later, where he remained for the season.

The team signed the wideout to a future/reserve contract in February. The Jets waived Henry on August 29.

Carolina Panthers
Henry was signed to the Carolina Panthers practice squad on September 23, 2010.

Edmonton Eskimos
Henry signed a contract with the Edmonton Eskimos of the Canadian Football League on April 5, 2011. He sustained an injury and only played in 11 games in the 2011 CFL season. In his first year in the CFL he recorded 384 yards and 1 touchdown. Henry sat out the first half of 2012 with a knee injury sustained in training camp. This time playing in the second half of the season Henry played in 9 games for the Eskimos. Marcus Henry had a similar season with regards to production amassing 382 yards and 1 receiving touchdown. Following the 2012 CFL season he was not re-signed and became a free-agent in mid February 2013. However, on May 1, 2013 Henry re-signed with the Eskimos. The 2013 season will be Henry's third with the Eskimos. Henry appeared in 12 games for the Eskimos in the 2013 season. By the end of the season he compiled 535 receiving yards on 34 receptions, with 1 touchdown.

Ottawa RedBlacks
Henry signed as a free-agent with the expansion Ottawa RedBlacks prior to the 2014 season. Henry went on to lead the RedBlacks receiving corps in receptions and yardage amassing career best of 824 yards on 67 receptions. Following the 2014 season the Redblacks made a series of high-profile signings to bolster their wide receiving corps, leaving Henry's roster status in more doubt than had been anticipated. Henry only appeared in one game during the 2015 season: He missed the majority of the season due to injury. He was not re-signed by the Redblacks following the season, and thus became a free-agent on February 9, 2016. 
Henry attended the Edmonton Eskimos mini-camp in Florida in late April in an attempt to qualify for the team's main training camp.

Montreal Alouettes
Henry was signed to the Montreal Alouettes' practice roster. He made his first start in the October 22, 2016 game against the Saskatchewan Roughriders, where he scored a touchdown.

CFL stats

Personal life
He has a fraternal twin brother Maurice, who played with him in high school and college.

References

External links

Ottawa Redblacks bio 
Edmonton Eskimos player bio
Kansas Jayhawks bio

1986 births
Living people
African-American players of American football
African-American players of Canadian football
American football wide receivers
Canadian football wide receivers
Carolina Panthers players
Edmonton Elks players
Kansas Jayhawks football players
Montreal Alouettes players
New York Jets players
People from Hinesville, Georgia
Players of American football from Georgia (U.S. state)
Ottawa Redblacks players
21st-century African-American sportspeople
20th-century African-American people